Calamotropha camilla is a moth in the family Crambidae. It was described by Stanisław Błeszyński in 1966. It is found in the Democratic Republic of the Congo.

References

Crambinae
Moths described in 1966